Shooting competitions at the 2015 Pan American Games in Toronto were held from July 12 to 19 at the Toronto International Trap and Skeet Club (Pan Am Shooting Centre) in Innisfil. The competition was split into three disciplines, pistol, rifle and shotgun, which were further divided into different events. Men competed in nine events, with the women competing in six events for a total of 15 gold medals awarded.

The winners of all fifteen events, along with the runner up in the men's air rifle, skeet, trap and both women's rifle events would qualify for the 2016 Summer Olympics in Rio de Janeiro, Brazil (granted the athlete has not yet earned a quota for their country).

Competition schedule

The following is the competition schedule for the shooting competitions:

Medal table

Medalists

Men's events

Women's events

Participating nations
A total of 26 countries qualified athletes. The number of athletes a nation entered is in parentheses beside the name of the country.

Qualification

A total of 250 sport shooters will qualify to compete at the games. The winner of each event at the 2014 South American Games and 2014 Central American and Caribbean Games will qualify for the Games. The remaining qualifying spots will be decided at the 2014 Pan American Shooting Championship. The host nation is guaranteed 15 athletes (one per event) and a further five wildcards will be awarded. A nation may enter a maximum of 25 athletes across all events.

See also
Shooting at the 2016 Summer Olympics

References

External link
Official Results Book

 
Events at the 2015 Pan American Games
2015
2015 in shooting sports
Shooting competitions in Canada